Hydrichthys is a genus of colonial marine hydrozoans formerly placed in the family Hydrichthyidae but is now included in the family Pandeidae. The polyps of members of this genus are parasitic. The polyp attaches itself to a fish, and in one species exhibits hyperparasitism by attaching itself to a copepod, itself the parasite of a fish.

Parasitism
The life history of hydrozoans typically has a larval, polyp stage and a bell-shaped medusa stage. In Hydrichthys, the polyp has no tentacles but develops a root-like stolon which it thrusts through the skin of its host, usually a fish, to suck the blood and body fluids. During the medusa stage, Hydrichthys lives independently in the ocean. In one species, Hydrichthys sarcotretis, parasitism is taken a stage further when the hydrozoan attaches itself to the copepod Cardiodectes medusaeus. This is itself an ectoparasite of lanternfish in the family Myctophidae. The copepod attaches itself to the bulbus arteriosus of the fish. Such a parasitic chain is known as hyperparasitism. The actions of the copepod castrate its fish host. Both male and female fish do not reproduce and seem to grow faster when attacked by the copepod and it seems to have a negligible energy demand from them. The hydrozoan parasite castrates the copepod, a process called hypercastration.

Species
The World Register of Marine Species recognises the following species:
Hydrichthys boycei Warren, 1916
Hydrichthys cyclothonis Damas, 1934
Hydrichthys mirus Fewkes, 1887
Hydrichthys pacificus Miyashita, 1941
Hydrichthys pietschi Martin, 1975
Hydrichthys sarcotretis (Jungersen, 1913)

References

Parasitic cnidarians
Pandeidae
Hydrozoan genera